Paola Turbay Gómez (born November 29, 1970) is a Colombian-American actress, model, beauty queen, and television presenter.

Related to Julio César Turbay Ayala, Turbay represented Bogotá in the Miss Colombia beauty pageant and won in 1991. She was the first runner-up in the 1992 Miss Universe competition.

After finishing her studies in psychology at the Universidad de los Andes, Turbay focused on her career as a model and presenter in entertainment news segments on Noticias QAP and Noticiero C newscasts, as well as an actress. In 2005 she was the official presenter, with Miguel Varoni, of the National Beauty Pageant. She has also made cameo appearances in several Colombian series like O todos en la cama, Ecomoda (sequel to Betty la fea) and Leche ("Milk").

After studying acting in Hollywood, Florida, Turbay became the main character of the RCN TV comedy Noticias calientes ("Hot News") in 2002. Two years later she would star the telenovela Las noches de Luciana ("The Nights of Luciana") and in 2006 would present the Colombian version of Dancing with the Stars, Bailando por un Sueño. Paola has also made brief appearances in films such as Lenny the Wonder Dog and Love in the Time of Cholera.

In 2007, Turbay played Isabel Vega on the CBS series Cane, which was canceled in May 2008 after only one season. In 2008 she has been participating as a recurring guest star on the ABC series The Secret Life of the American Teenager. She also guested on the Showtime series Californication (Season 2, ep. 8, "Going Down and Out in Beverly Hills") and had a recurring role as an LAPD detective during the fifth season of TNT's The Closer.

On January 6, 2010, she played the role of Beatriz on the CBS series The Mentalist (Season 3, ep. 11, "Bloodsport").

Paola played the role of Antonia Gavilán de Logroño for the fourth season of the HBO series True Blood.

Starting in 2010, she had a recurring role on Royal Pains as Marissa Cassaras, Boris' love interest, and mother of his son.

In 2014 she founded IndieBo, the Bogotá Independent Film Festival, of which she is the executive director. IndieBo is a showcase of the best Colombian and International Independent films, held in Bogota, Colombia. It was founded in September 2014 with the firm belief that Bogota needs spaces that contribute to the evolution of film and audience alike. IndieBo aims to convert the city into a stage that brings great media and technology together, and to create an audience that is willing to take more artistic risks.

References

External links
 
 Paola Turbay's official website
  Profile at Colarte (includes several magazine articles)

1970 births
American actresses
American people of Colombian descent
American people of Lebanese descent
Colombian people of Lebanese descent
Colombian actresses
Colombian female models
Colombian television presenters
Living people
Miss Colombia winners
Miss Universe 1992 contestants
Paola
Colombian women television presenters
21st-century American women
Colombian American
Colombian actors
American actors